The Luna Theater, at 2-6 Main St. in Clayton, New Mexico, is a historic theatre that was built in 1915–1916.  It was opened as the Mission Theater in 1915 and was renamed to the Luna Theater in 1935.

The building includes Mission/Spanish Revival architecture and was listed on the National Register of Historic Places in 2007.

The theater was saved by preservationists and continues to show movies today.

See also

Eklund Hotel, across the street, also National Register-listed
National Register of Historic Places listings in Union County, New Mexico

References

External links
The Luna Theater in Clayton, NM, YouTube video on Luna Theater history
Clayton's Luna Theater Video NM MainStreet, another YouTube video
Clayton, NM: Luna Theater

Theatres on the National Register of Historic Places in New Mexico
Mission Revival architecture in New Mexico
Buildings and structures completed in 1916
Buildings and structures in Union County, New Mexico
National Register of Historic Places in Union County, New Mexico